Highland School District is a public school district based in Highland, Arkansas, United States. The school district encompasses  of land including portions of Sharp County and Fulton County communities including Hardy, Highland, Ash Flat, Horseshoe Bend, Williford, and Cherokee Village.

The district proves comprehensive education for kindergarten through grade 12 is accredited by the Arkansas Department of Education (ADE).

History 
The district was established in 1962 as a result of consolidating the former Ash Flat and Hardy school districts.

On July 1, 2010, the Twin Rivers School District was dissolved. A portion of the district was given to the Highland district.

Schools 
 Highland High School, serving more than 500 students in grades 9 through 12.
 Highland Middle School, serving approximately 500 students in grades 5 through 8.
 Chereokee Elementary School, serving approximately 600 students in kindergarten through grade 4.

References

External links 
 

School districts in Arkansas
Education in Sharp County, Arkansas
Education in Fulton County, Arkansas
School districts established in 1962
1962 establishments in Arkansas